Curtain wall may refer to:

 Curtain wall (architecture), the outer skin of a modern building
 Curtain wall (fortification), the outer wall of a castle or defensive wall between two bastions